Lesley Brannan (born 13 September 1976) is a Welsh hammer thrower.

Brannan was born in Connah's Quay, Flintshire.  Her personal best throw is 63.05 metres, achieved in February 2006 in Manchester. This is the current Welsh record, and places her sixth on the British outdoor all-time list, behind Lorraine Shaw, Shirley Webb, Zoe Derham, Lyn Sprules and Liz Pidgeon.

International competitions

References

2006 Commonwealth Games profile

1976 births
Living people
People from Connah's Quay
Sportspeople from Flintshire
British female hammer throwers
Welsh hammer throwers
Welsh female athletes
Commonwealth Games competitors for Wales
Athletes (track and field) at the 2002 Commonwealth Games
Athletes (track and field) at the 2006 Commonwealth Games